The year 1556 CE in science and technology included a number of events, some of which are listed here.

Astronomy and earth sciences
 January 23 – Shaanxi earthquake in China.
 February – Great Comet of 1556 becomes visible in Europe.
 Publication of Georgius Agricola's textbook on metal mining and processing, De re metallica (posthumously, at Basel).
 Minas de Ríotinto in Huelva, Andalusia, rediscovered.

Life sciences
 Publication in Rome of Juan Valverde de Amusco's Historia de la composicion del cuerpo humano, including Realdo Colombo's discovery of pulmonary circulation.
 Publication of the standard reference work on marine animals, Libri de piscibus marinis in quibus verae piscium effigies expressae sunt by Guillaume Rondelet, Chancellor of the University of Montpellier; his anatomical drawing of a sea urchin is the earliest extant depiction of an invertebrate. Rondelet's Methodus de materia medicinali et compositione medicamentorum Palavii is also published.
 Cholera outbreak in Oran.

Births
 February 21 – Sethus Calvisius, German musician and astronomer (died 1615)
 August 24 – Sophia Brahe, Danish astronomer (died 1643)

Deaths
 November 10 – Richard Chancellor, English Arctic explorer (drowned at sea) (born c. 1521)
 'Denis Zachaire', French alchemist (born 1520)

References

 
16th century in science
1550s in science